Brynrefail is a small village in Gwynedd, Wales.

Location 

It is located in the civil parish of Moelfre on the A5025 between Amlwch and Benllech.

Amenities 

As the settlement is very small it has very few amenities. Those it does have include a late 19th-century church, a craft shop/general store, a garden centre and a community hall which was opened in 1995. The island's only airsoft /paintball, OTT Airsoft Club, site is located close to the village and Tyddyn Mon, a 'Learning Disability Wales' centre, is found in the village.

The village is on bus route 62 which runs every half an hour between Bangor and Amlwch. It is the best stop for the beaches of Dulas Bay and Lligwy Bay (which are about 1.5 miles away) as well as the nearby camping and caravan sites.

Four men from the village lost their lives in World War II. Their names are displayed on the village war memorial next to the chapel.

External links 
photos of Brynrefail and surrounding area on geograph

Villages in Anglesey
Hamlets in Wales
Moelfre, Anglesey